Bercel is a village in Nógrád county, Hungary.

Twin towns – sister cities

Bercel is twinned with:
 Căpâlnița, Romania
 Modrý Kameň, Slovakia

References

Populated places in Nógrád County